Statistics of Emperor's Cup in the 1985 season.

Overview
It was contested by 32 teams, and Nissan Motors won the championship.

Results

1st round
Fujita Industries 2–1 Osaka University of Health and Sport Sciences
Tanabe Pharmaceuticals 3–1 Teijin
Yanmar Diesel 3–0 Cosmo Oil
Matsushita Electric 2–3 Mitsubishi Motors
Yamaha Motors 2–0 Chuo University
Nissei Resin 1–3 All Nippon Airways
Kokushikan University 2–3 Toyota Motors
Toshiba 1–2 Honda
Nippon Kokan 3–0 Tsukuba University
Sapporo University 0–2 Toho Titanium
Hitachi 6–0 Fukushima
Niigata Eleven 0–6 Nissan Motors
Yomiuri 3–0 Seino Transportation
Mazda 1–0 Sumitomo Metals
Doshisha University 0–2 Yawata Steel
Mitsubishi Chemical Kurosaki 0–9 Furukawa Electric

2nd round
Fujita Industries 1–0 Tanabe Pharmaceuticals
Yanmar Diesel 0–1 Mitsubishi Motors
Yamaha Motors 1–0 All Nippon Airways
Toyota Motors 2–1 Honda
Nippon Kokan 3–1 Toho Titanium
Hitachi 1–2 Nissan Motors
Yomiuri 0–1 Mazda
Yawata Steel 0–2 Furukawa Electric

Quarterfinals
Fujita Industries 2–0 Mitsubishi Motors
Yamaha Motors 1–2 Toyota Motors
Nippon Kokan 2–2 (PK 2–3) Nissan Motors
Mazda 2–1 Furukawa Electric

Semifinals
Fujita Industries 2–0 Toyota Motors
Nissan Motors 5–0 Mazda

Final

Fujita Industries 0–2 Nissan Motors
Nissan Motors won the championship Excluded from the Asian Cup Winners' Cup 1986.

References
 NHK

Emperor's Cup
Emperor's Cup
1986 in Japanese football